Oskar Dillon (born 10 February 1999), is an Australian professional footballer who plays as a centre back for Oakleigh Cannons in NPL Victoria.

Club career

Gold Coast Knights
Dillon was part of the 2019 NPL Queensland championship winning Gold Coast Knights team. He played the full game and scored the winning goal, a free-kick from 25 yards out, as the Knights' defeated Olympic FC 2-1 in the 2019 NPL Queensland Grand Final on 14 September 2019, claiming their first piece of top-flight silverware. After an impressive campaign, Dillon was awarded the NPL Queensland Young Player of the Year at the inaugural Football in Queensland Awards Night.

Western United
On 2 January 2020, Dillon signed his first professional contract with Western United, penning a one-year deal for the 2019-20 season. He made his debut in a Round 15 clash against Central Coast Mariners, playing the full game as United ran out 3-0 winners at GMHBA Stadium. Dillon was released by the club at the end of the 2019–20 A-League.

Honours

Club
Gold Coast Knights
NPL Queensland Championship: 2019

Individual
NPL Queensland Young Player of the Year: 2019

References

External links

1999 births
Living people
Australian soccer players
Association football defenders
Western United FC players
National Premier Leagues players
A-League Men players
People from Coffs Harbour
Sportsmen from New South Wales
Soccer players from New South Wales